Agonopterix elbursella is a moth in the family Depressariidae. It was described by Hans-Joachim Hannemann in 1976. It is found in Iran.

References

Moths described in 1976
Agonopterix
Moths of Asia